George H. Witter (August 23, 1854 – February 12, 1913) was an American physician and politician from New York.

Life 
Witter was born in Willing, New York on August 23, 1854. His parents were Daniel P. Witter and Betsey Foster.

Witter spent two years in West Point, after which he attended the College of Physicians and Surgeons in Baltimore, Maryland. After he graduated from the college as a physician in 1885, he began to practice medicine in Wellsville.

In Wellsville, Witter formed a partnership with Dr. H. H. Nye, his former medical teacher. He later succeeded to Nye's former practice. For many years, he served as company surgeon for the Erie Railroad and the Buffalo and Susquehanna Railroad. He was a member of the country, district, and state medical associations, the American Medical Association, the Hornell Medical Association, and the Surgical Association. He was also a member of the Wellsville board of education and vice-president of the First National Bank of Wellsville. He served as town supervisor of Wellsville, and was a member of the Republican County Committee of Allegany County and the New York Republican State Committee.

In the 1896 presidential election, Witter was a presidential elector for William McKinley and Garret Hobart. In 1908, he was elected to the New York State Senate as a Republican, representing the 44th District. He served in the Senate in 1909 and 1910.

Witter was a member and trustee of the Congregational Church. In 1889, he married Maude Bingham. They had two daughters, Grace and Margaret.

Witter died at home on February 12, 1913. He was buried in Woodlawn Cemetery.

References

External links 

 The Political Graveyard
 George H. Witter at Find a Grave

1854 births
1913 deaths
People from Wellsville, New York
United States Military Academy alumni
University of Maryland School of Medicine alumni
Physicians from New York (state)
School board members in New York (state)
Town supervisors in New York (state)
1896 United States presidential electors
20th-century American politicians
Republican Party New York (state) state senators
American Congregationalists
Burials in New York (state)